Barto is an unincorporated community situated between the boroughs of Bally and Bechtelsville in Washington Township, Berks County, Pennsylvania, United States. Barto is part of the Delaware Valley, located near the border with Montgomery County. Its zip code is 19504 and the West Branch Perkiomen Creek flows southeast through it to join the Perkiomen Creek in the Green Lane Reservoir.

References

Unincorporated communities in Pennsylvania
Unincorporated communities in Berks County, Pennsylvania